Colin Teague is a British film and television director. Born 1970 He grew up in High Wycombe, Buckinghamshire and studied at Redroofs Theatre School and the London International Film School.

He is most associated with Doctor Who, being the first person to have directed for the main series and both of its spin-offs, Torchwood and the pilot episode of The Sarah Jane Adventures. Due to a fall he took down some stairs in 2007, he was known on the Doctor Who set as "Tumblin' Teague".  In 2009 and 2011, Teague was BAFTA Award-nominated for Being Human.  In 2011, he directed Frankenstein's Wedding, broadcast live from Leeds on BBC3, and Shirley, a biopic on the singer Shirley Bassey which won a Cymru Bafta for Best Single Drama. In 2012, he directed The Town, a three-part drama for ITV. In 2013, he directed The White Queen for BBC/Starz, which gained three Golden Globe Award nominations.

Selected filmography

 The Last Drop (2005)
 Holby City (2003–2006)
 Torchwood
 "Ghost Machine" (2006)
 "Greeks Bearing Gifts" (2006)
 "Sleeper" (2008)
 "Meat" (2008)
 The Sarah Jane Adventures
 "Invasion of the Bane" (2007)
 Doctor Who
 "The Sound of Drums" (2007)
 "Last of the Time Lords" (2007)
 "The Fires of Pompeii" (2008)
 Being Human
 Series 1, Episode 5 (2009)
 Series 1, Episode 6 (2009)
 Series 2, Episode 1 (2010)
 Series 2, Episode 2 (2010)
 Shirley (2011)
 Sinbad
 "Kuji" (2012)
 "Eye of the Tiger" (2012)
 "For Whom the Egg Shatters" (2012)

 The Town (three-part TV drama, 2012)
 The White Queen
 BBC/Starz TV series (2013)
 Dragonheart 3: The Sorcerer's Curse (2015)
 Spotless
 Not a Place, a Circumstance (2015) 
 Someone's Son, Somebody's Daughter (2015)
 Da Vinci's Demons
 Alis Volat Propriis (2015) 
 La Confessione Della Macchina (2015)
 Jekyll & Hyde
 The Harbinger (2015) 
 Mr Hyde (2015)
 The Cutter (2015)
 Beowulf: Return to the Shieldlands
 Episode #1.6 (2016) 
 Episode #1.7 (2016)
 Hooten & the Lady
 The Amazon (2016) 
 Rome (2016)
 James Patterson's Murder Is Forever
 Murder Interrupted (2018) 
 Mother of All Murders (2018)
 ‘’Rashash (2021)
 Session 1

References

External links
 
 Interviews about directing Torchwood

British television directors
Living people
People educated at Redroofs Theatre School
People from High Wycombe
1970 births